Fatal Instinct is a 2014 American thriller film, written, directed and produced by Luciano Saber,  starring Ivan Sergei, Masiela Lusha, Richard Burgi, Drew Fuller, Krista Allen, Peter Dobson, and Anne Winters. The film premiered in the United States on June 3, 2014, airing on the Showtime network.

Plot
A police detective follows a trail of evidence that eventually seems to lead to his trusted partner's ex-con brother who he helped put in prison years ago.

Cast
 Ivan Sergei as Jack Gates
 Masiela Lusha as Melissa Gates
 Richard Burgi as Michael Decker
 Drew Fuller as Danny Gates
 Krista Allen as Jen Decker
 Peter Dobson as Sgt. Birch 
 Anne Winters as Kelly Decker
 Adrian Tudor as Father Paul
 Dominique Swain as Ally
 Scott Freeburg as Skinner
 Giovanni Adams as Mason
 Brenton Earley as Officer Smith 
 Devan Gavin as Tai
 Parker Harris as Johnny
 Kovar McClure as John
 Russell Charles Pitts as Leon 
 Ann Reilly as Grace
 Jonathan Root as Officer Stevens
 Natalie Shaw as Gabby
 Mark St. Amant as Mr. Weiner
 Emily Tudor as Elly
 Nicole Tudor as Nikkita
 Brittany Wagner as Izzy
 Jett Weinstein as Timmy

References

External links
 
 

2014 films
American thriller films
Films shot in Los Angeles
2014 thriller films
2010s English-language films
2010s American films